Baskett is a surname that may refer to:
Ann Baskett (contemporary), English actress, critic, and painter
Hank Baskett (born 1982), American professional football player
James Baskett (1904–1948), American actor; portrayed Uncle Remus in the Disney film Song of the South
John Baskett (died 1742), English printer
Kendra Baskett (a.k.a. Kendra Wilkinson) (born 1985), American glamour model and television personality

Other uses
Baskett, Kentucky

See also
Baskette (surname)
Basket (disambiguation)